The -weight of a string, for a letter , is the number of times that letter occurs in the string.

Examples 
 Let .

Semigroup theory